Kloofendal Nature Reserve is a municipal nature reserve in Roodepoort, South Africa. It is one of the first nature reserves in Johannesburg. It is also recognized as the place where gold was first mined in Johannesburg. The old gold mine can be visited by appointment. There are hiking trails and a small dam.

Small animals in the reserve 
Many small mammals are found at Kloofendal, including:
 Duiker
 Mountain reedbuck
 Rock hyrax
 Mongoose
 Southern African hedgehog
 Black-backed jackal
 Blesmol

Birds 
Kloofendal is home to many species of birds and in particular:
 Black sparrowhawk
 Wailing cisticola

History of the gold mine 

The Confidence Reef was discovered by the brothers Fred and Harry Struben on 18 September 1884. This led to an influx of prospectors to the Witwatersrand, culminating in the discovery of the Main gold reef in 1886. The first payable gold on the Rand was extracted by the Strubens on this site but the Confidence reef bore little gold and their mine was unprofitable. The mine was declared a National Monument on 29 July 1983.

References

External links 
 Friends of Kloofendal website
 Trail map of Kloofendal Nature Reserve

Nature reserves in South Africa
Johannesburg Region C